Ammobates is a genus of insects belonging to the family Apidae.

The species of this genus are found in Europe, Africa and South America.

Species:
 Ammobates ancylae (Warncke, 1983) 
 Ammobates armeniacus (Morawitz, 1876)
 Ammobates arsinoe (Engel, 2009)
 Ammobates assimilis (Warncke, 1983)
 Ammobates atrorufus (Warncke, 1983)
 Ammobates aurantiacus (Popov, 1951)
 Ammobates auster (Eardley, 1997)
 Ammobates baueri (Warncke, 1983)
 Ammobates biastoides (Friese, 1895)
 Ammobates buteus (Warncke, 1983)
 Ammobates carinatus (Morawitz, 1872) 
 Ammobates chinospilus (Baker, 1974)
 Ammobates cinnamomeus (Engel, 2008)
 Ammobates cockerelli (Popov, 1951)
 Ammobates depressus (Friese, 1911)
 Ammobates dubius (Benoist, 1961)
 Ammobates dusmeti (Popov, 1951)
 Ammobates handlirschi (Friese, 1895)
 Ammobates hipponensis (Pérez, 1902)
 Ammobates iranicus (Warncke, 1983)
 Ammobates latitarsis (Friese, 1899) 
 Ammobates lativalvis (Popov, 1951)
 Ammobates lebedevi (Popov, 1951)
 Ammobates major (Pérez, 1902)
 Ammobates mavromoustakisi (Popov, 1944)
 Ammobates maxschwarzi (Engel, 2008
 Ammobates minor (Pérez, 1902)
 Ammobates minutissimus (Mavromoustakis, 1959)
 Ammobates monticolus (Warncake, 1985)
 Ammobates muticus (Spinola, 1843)
 Ammobates nigrinus (Morawitz, 1875) 
 Ammobates niveatus (Spinola, 1838)
 Ammobates obscuratus (Morawitz, 1894)
 Ammobates opacus (Popov, 1951)
 Ammobates oraniensis (Lepeletier, 1841)
 Ammobates oxianus (Popov, 1951)
 Ammobates persicus (Mavromoustakis, 1968)
 Ammobates punctatus (Fabricius, 1804)
 Ammobates robustus (Friese, 1899)
 Ammobates roseus (Morawitz, 1895)
 Ammobates rostratus (Friese, 1899)
 Ammobates rufiventris (Latreille, 1809)
 Ammobates sanguineus (Friese, 1911)
 Ammobates similis (Mocsáry, 1894)
 Ammobates solitarius (Nurse, 1904)
 Ammobates syriacus (Friese, 1899)
 Ammobates teheranicus (Mavromoustakis, 1968)
 Ammobates turanicus (Popov, 1951)
 Ammobates verhoeffi (Mavromoustakis, 1959)
 Ammobates vinctus (Gerstäcker, 1869)

References

Apidae
Hymenoptera genera